Ripert is a French surname that may refer to:

Colette Ripert (1930–1999), French actress
Éric Ripert (born 1965), French chef, author and television personality 
Émile Ripert (1882–1948), French academic, poet, novelist and playwright.
François de Ripert-Monclar (1844–1921), French aristocrat, landowner and diplomat
Georges Ripert 1880–1958), French lawyer, briefly Secretary of State for Public Instruction and Youth
Jean-Maurice Ripert (born 1953), French diplomat
Jean-Pierre-François de Ripert-Monclar (1711–1773), French aristocrat, landowner and lawyer

French-language surnames